Martina Merlo (born 19 February 1993) is an Italian middle-distance runner and steeplechase runner.

Achievements

National titles
Merlo won four national championships.

 Italian Athletics Championships
 3000 metres steeplechase: 2020, 2021 (2)
 10,000 metres: 2021
 Italian Cross Country Championships
 Long race: 2018

See also
 Italian all-time top lists – 3000 m steeplechase
 Italian team at the running events

References

External links
 

1993 births
Athletics competitors of Centro Sportivo Aeronautica Militare
Italian female steeplechase runners
Italian female middle-distance runners
Italian female long-distance runners
Living people
Sportspeople from Turin
Italian Athletics Championships winners
20th-century Italian women
21st-century Italian women